John Walsh (born in Ireland) was a member of the Legislature of Dakota Territory.

In 1869, he established a homestead five miles east of Elk Point in Union County, Dakota Territory.  He was known as "Honest John" and was later elected to the Dakota Territorial Legislature, where he served from 1881 to 1882.

External links
John Walsh's record in the South Dakota Legislature Historical Listing

Year of death missing
Year of birth missing
Members of the Dakota Territorial Legislature
19th-century American politicians
Irish emigrants to the United States (before 1923)
People from Union County, South Dakota